On Such a Night is a 1937 American crime film directed by Ewald André Dupont and starring Grant Richards, Karen Morley, and Roscoe Karns. It was made by Paramount Pictures and sold to MCA-Universal in 1958 for television syndication.

Plot

Cast

Grant Richards as Nicky Last
Karen Morley as Gail Stanley
Roscoe Karns as Joe Flynn
Eduardo Ciannelli as Ice Richmond
Milly as Mlle. Mimi Candle
Alan Mowbray as Professor Ricardo Montrose Candle
Robert McWade as Colonel Fentridge
Esther Dale as Miss Belinda Fentridge
John Wray as Guard Rumann
Frank Reicher as Horace Darwin
Paul Fix as Maxie Barnes

References

External links

1937 films
American crime drama films
1937 crime drama films
Films directed by E. A. Dupont
Films scored by Ernst Toch
American black-and-white films
1930s English-language films
1930s American films